William Trimnel (died 15 April 1729) was a Church of England clergyman who served as Archdeacon of Norwich around 1720 and as Dean of Winchester from 1722 to 1729.

References

Archdeacons of Norwich
Deans of Winchester
18th-century English Anglican priests
1729 deaths